Imagine Publishing was a UK-based magazine publisher, which published a number of video games, computing, creative and lifestyle magazines.

It was founded on 14 May 2005 with private funds by Damian Butt, Steven Boyd and Mark Kendrick, all were former directors of Paragon Publishing, and launched with a core set of six gaming and creative computing titles in the first 6 months of trading. It was taken over by Future plc on 21 October 2016.

In October 2005, it had acquired the only retro games magazine Retro Gamer, after its original publisher, Live Publishing went bankrupt. Early in 2006, it further acquired the rights to publish a considerable number of titles including gamesTM, Play, PowerStation, X360, Digital Photographer and iCreate, from the old Paragon Publishing stable of magazines when owner Highbury House Communications went into liquidation, following Future Publishing's withdrawal of its offer to buy the company, due to threats of a monopoly-investigation by the United Kingdom Competition Commission.

In May 2006, Imagine launched its first bookazines, initially focusing on technology content for Photoshop and Mac. This portfolio would become one of Imagine's core strengths, with worldwide distribution, notably in the US and Australia.

In 2007 Imagine launched SciFiNow, the Official Corel Painter Magazine, HD Review and Total PC Gaming.

Total 911 was acquired from 9 Publishing in 2008, and was purchased to demonstrate that Imagine's efficient publishing model could be applied to any market, not just technology.

2009 saw the company's most significant and successful new magazine launch - How It Works, which quickly became Imagine's flagship title and paved the way for the creation of a whole knowledge division. How It Works was the brainchild of CD Mark Kendrick, whose love of 70s Ladybird books spawned a desire to create a lavishly illustrated, simple-to-understand new educational magazine for families.

Linux User & Developer was acquired in 2009. 3D Artist was launched into the niche CGI magazine market. Imagine's main videogames website NowGamer.com went live in 2009 also.

In partnership with PixelMags, Imagine became the second publisher to migrate its entire portfolio as digital editions on the iPad/iPhone for the US launch in March 2010.

Imagine launched the world's third title for the Android OS - Android Magazine in 2011, following successful bookazine tests of this topic.

2011 also saw Imagine embrace digital publishing further by giving all employees a free iPad, or cash alternative.

In 2012 Imagine expanded its knowledge magazine division with new launch All About Space, followed in 2013 with All About History and World of Animals. A new digital editions publishing platform - Martini - went live in this year, with all Imagine titles migrating onto this bespoke platform, developed in partnership with Bournemouth-based tech company 3SidedCube.

Imagine was featured in the Sunday Times Profit Track 100 lists in 2013 and 2014; recognising the company's strong financial results, including a high net margin.

In 2015 the company moved into a new market, with Real Crime magazine. To celebrate its tenth year in publishing, free engraved iPad Mini were offered to all staff.

Imagine's final two magazine launches were in 2016, with History of Royals in April and Explore History in May.

At the point when it was acquired by Future plc, Imagine Publishing was a worldwide multimedia content producer and in October 2016 it had a portfolio of 20 regular print magazines, 25 websites, 30 mobile apps and a portfolio of over 1,200 bookazines - all published worldwide within the four key markets – technology, photography, knowledge/science and videogames.

Key titles
Key magazine titles published by Imagine Publishing included:

 Play
 GamesTM
 Retro Gamer
 SciFiNow (Sold to Kelsey Media in 2017)
 Digital Photographer
 iCreate
 Web Designer
 Photoshop Creative
 Total 911
 Linux User and Developer
 3D Artist
 How It Works
 All About Space
 All About History
 World of Animals
 History of War
 NowGamer.com
 Gadget
 Real Crime
 History of Royals
 boot (ISSN 1088-5439)
 Practical Digital Video
 Windows XP Made Easy
 Digital Camera Buyer
 PC Home

All of Imagine's publications are now owned by Future Publishing.

References

External links
Imagine Publishing official website

2005 establishments in the United Kingdom
2016 disestablishments in the United Kingdom
Computer magazine publishing companies
Magazine publishing companies of the United Kingdom
Publishing companies established in 2005
Publishing companies disestablished in 2016
Companies based in Bournemouth